Panin is a Russian surname.

Panin may also refer to:

 Pancreatic intraepithelial neoplasia (PanIN), a type of pancreatic cancer precursor
 Pan (genus) or the panins, the hominid genus that comprises chimpanzees and bonobos
 Panin Sekuritas, an Indonesian financial services company
 Panin Boakye (born 1995), Ghanaian footballer

See also
 Panini (disambiguation)
 Panino (inhabited locality), several settlements in Russia